Nathaniel Day Cochrane (bapt. 22 November 1780 – 16 November 1844) was a British naval officer.

He was born in Québec, the illegitimate son of Paymaster Hon. John Cochrane, third (surviving) son of Thomas Cochrane, 8th Earl of Dundonald, and Geneviève Dulan. Nathaniel had a sister, Angelica, a brother, Colonel James Johnson Cochrane of the 3rd Guards, and a half-brother (probably) John Cochrane, a lawyer. This John Cochrane may have been John Cochrane the well-known chess master.

Cochrane entered the Navy in 1794 and received a promotion to Lieutenant in 1800. While on the West Indies Station he captured several vessels before bringing news to Sir John Thomas Duckworth's squadron that three French ships of the line had been sighted sailing towards Santo Domingo. He was posted with date of seniority of 26 March 1806, on his return to England with the news of the Battle of San Domingo (which his uncle Admiral Alexander Cochrane had fought in.) In 1812 he took command of the 74-gun third-rate ship of the line , and remained her commander until 1814.

On 23 November 1841 he was promoted to Rear-Admiral of the Blue.
 
Rear Admiral Cochrane died on 16 November 1844 at his brother's house at Bathford, Somerset. He never married, but had an illegitimate daughter, Emily (born 1825; died a spinster 1919).

References

1780 births
1844 deaths
Royal Navy personnel of the French Revolutionary Wars
Royal Navy personnel of the Napoleonic Wars
Royal Navy rear admirals
Nathaniel